Kahriz-e Kur Bolagh (also Romanized as Kahrīz-e Kūr Bolāgh; also known as Kahrīz-e Kūrbolāghī) is a village in Baladarband Rural District, in the Central District of Kermanshah County, Kermanshah Province, Iran. At the 2006 census, its population was 78, in 21 families.

References 

Populated places in Kermanshah County